The 1995 Broadland District Council election took place on 4 May 1995 to elect members of Broadland District Council in England. This was on the same day as other local elections.

Election result

References

1995 English local elections
May 1995 events in the United Kingdom
1995
1990s in Norfolk